The 2019 Folds of Honor QuikTrip 500 was a Monster Energy NASCAR Cup Series race that was held on February 24, 2019, at Atlanta Motor Speedway in Hampton, Georgia. Contested over 325 laps on the 1.54-mile-long (2.48 km) asphalt quad-oval intermediate speedway, it was the second race of the 2019 Monster Energy NASCAR Cup Series season.

The race was the first since the 2002 Protection One 400 no to featuring Jamie McMurray on the starting grid.

Report

Background

Atlanta Motor Speedway (formerly Atlanta International Raceway) is a track in Hampton, Georgia, 20 miles (32 km) south of Atlanta. It is a  quad-oval track with a seating capacity of 111,000. It opened in 1960 as a  standard oval. In 1994, 46 condominiums were built over the northeastern side of the track. In 1997, to standardize the track with Speedway Motorsports' other two  ovals, the entire track was almost completely rebuilt. The frontstretch and backstretch were swapped, and the configuration of the track was changed from oval to quad-oval. The project made the track one of the fastest on the NASCAR circuit.

Entry list

First practice

Qualifying

Qualifying results

Final practice

Race

Stage Results

Stage One

Laps: 85

Stage Two

Laps: 85

Final Stage Results

Stage Three
Laps: 155

Race statistics
 Lead changes: 26 among 9 different drivers
 Cautions/Laps: 5 for 30
 Red flags: 0
 Time of race: 3 hours, 30 minutes and 33 seconds
 Average speed:

Media

Television
The Folds of Honor QuikTrip 500 was carried by Fox in the United States. Mike Joy, five-time Atlanta winner Jeff Gordon and three-time Atlanta winner Darrell Waltrip covered the race from the booth. Pit road was manned by Jamie Little, Vince Welch and Matt Yocum.

Radio
The race was broadcast on radio by the Performance Racing Network and simulcast on Sirius XM NASCAR Radio. Doug Rice and Mark Garrow called the race from the booth when the field  down the front stretch. Rob Albright called the race from atop a billboard outside of turn 2 when the field raced through turns 1 and 2 & Pat Patterson called the race from a billboard outside of turn 3 when the field raced through turns 3 and 4. On pit road, PRN was manned by Brad Gillie, Brett McMillan, Wendy Venturini and Doug Turnbull.

Standings after the race

Drivers' Championship standings

Manufacturers' Championship standings

Note: Only the first 16 positions are included for the driver standings.

References

2019 in sports in Georgia (U.S. state)
2019 Monster Energy NASCAR Cup Series
NASCAR races at Atlanta Motor Speedway
February 2019 sports events in the United States